This is a list of seasons completed by the Arizona State University men's ice hockey team.  The list documents the season-by-season records of the Sun Devils from 2015 to present, including postseason results.

Season-by-season results
Note: GP = Games played, W = Wins, L = Losses, T = Ties

* Winning percentage is used when conference schedules are unbalanced.

References

 
Lists of college men's ice hockey seasons in the United States
Arizona sports-related lists